Walter Lamb (8 January 1825 – 13 November 1906) was an Australian businessman, banker and politician. In 1889 he was appointed to the New South Wales Legislative Council, where he served until 1893. A member of the Lamb banking family, he became a director of the Commercial Banking Company of Sydney in 1860. In 1880, he became chairman of the Colonial Sugar Refining Company.

His father Commander John Lamb was a Commercial Banking Company of Sydney director, as were his brothers Alfred Lamb, Edward Lamb and John de Villiers Lamb. His sister-in-law by John de Villiers Lamb, Henrietta Lamb (née Smith), was the sister of the deputy chairman of the Commercial Banking Company of Sydney, Thomas Smith. He married Margaret Elizabeth Dangar, daughter of Australian politician and explorer Henry Dangar.

Early life 
He was born in London to the Australian banker and politician John Lamb and Emma (née Robinson). His mother Emma Lamb (née Robinson) was the daughter of the deputy chairman of Lloyds Bank. His family migrated to Sydney in 1829, and, after his education, Lamb became a clerk in his father's mercantile firm and became a partner in 1847. At 15 he became a clerk in his father's firm and at 22 a partner in Lamb, Spry & Co.

Career 
On his return from a visit to England in February 1857 he, his brother John and Charles Parbury carried on as Lamb, Parbury & Co. In January 1855 Lamb had become an original shareholder and director of the Colonial Sugar Refining Company and in 1880 chairman. By 1860 he was a director of the Commercial Banking Co. of Sydney, the Australian General Assurance Co. and the Sydney Exchange Co., and had served on the committees of the Sydney Chamber of Commerce and the Union Club. He remained active in the family firm until 1863, when he became a pastoralist with a large orchard and fruit cannery. He was an early director of the Colonial Sugar Refining Company, and was an active member of the Anti-Transportation League. In 1889 he was appointed to the New South Wales Legislative Council, where he served until 1893. Lamb died at Rooty Hill in 1906.

Further details 
Around 1846 he married Jane Cox, with whom he had a daughter. He subsequently married Margaret Elizabeth Dangar, daughter of Australian politician and explorer Henry Dangar, on 11 February 1858, with whom he had a further nine children. His brother John de Villiers Lamb married Henrietta Octavia (née Smith), sister of Thomas Whistler Smith, an Australian politician and banker who became deputy chairman of the Commercial Banking Company of Sydney, and who was in turn the brother-in-law of John Street, founder of the Street dynasty.

References

1825 births
1906 deaths
Members of the New South Wales Legislative Council
19th-century Australian politicians